The Isabelle Gatti de Gamond Royal Atheneum (French: Athénée royal Isabelle Gatti de Gamond) is a French-speaking K-12 school located in Brussels, Belgium. When founded in 1864 by Isabelle Gatti de Gamond, the school was the first non-confessional school for girls in Belgium.

History 
Established on October 3, 1864, under the name Cours supérieur d'éducation pour jeunes filles, the school is the oldest state middle and high school for girls in Belgium.

The school extended its curriculum throughout the second half of the 19th century with the creation of a kindergarten (1879), a department of pedagogy providing educational training to future female schoolteachers (1880) and a university preparatory department (1894). It was named Lycée royal Gatti de Gamond in 1948 and adopted its current name with the implementation of mixed-sex education in 1976.

Since the closure of the Athénée royal de Bruxelles (fr) in 2002, the school has been the only state atheneum in the Communauté française network located within the limits of the Brussels historical city center.

Education 
The school from the ‘Enseignement officiel de la Communauté française de Belgique’ state schools network offers general and vocational education and is located on two campuses:
 Primary School (pre-k – grade 7) : 9 rue du Canon - Brussels 1000
 Secondary school (grades 7-12) : 65 rue du Marais – Brussels 1000

Alumni

Former principals 
Isabelle Gatti de Gamond (1864-1899), Cornélie Nourry (1899-1902), Lilla Monod (1902-1919), Germaine Collaer-Feytmans (1919-1926), Juliette Orban (1926), Juliette Daco-Wéry (1926-1944), Angèle Ramoisy (1944-1958), Hélène Andries-Leva (1958-1977), Betty Wéry-Hofman (1977-1978), René Pira (1978), Rose Delmez (1978-1979), Olga Bosschaert (1978-1980), Pierre Willemart (1980-1989), Andrée Depauw (1990), Jean-Pierre Goman (1990), Bernadette Genotte (1991-2004), Nicole Antoine (2004-2009); Hugues Thiry (2009-2010); André Charneux (2010-2013), Bertrand Wilquet (2014), Pascal Hallemans (2015-2017) and Bertrand Wilquet (since 2017).

Former teachers 
 Henriette Dachsbeck, feminist.
 Andrée Geulen, 'Righteous Among the Nations'.
 Odile Henri (1892-1945) : former teacher and head of the boarding section, she was deported to the Bergen-Belsen concentration camp after having hidden Jewish children at the school boarding section. 
 Anne Morelli, historian, professor at Université libre de Bruxelles
 Louise Popelin (1850-1937) : one of the three first female university students in Belgium (1880).
 Marie Popelin : first Belgian woman to receive a doctorate in law.

Former students 
 Alain Berliner, film director
 Georgette Ciselet, Belgian senator
 Marie Closset, poet
 Martine Cornil, journalist
 Farid El Asri, anthropologist, professor at Université catholique de Louvain
 Alexis Goslain, actor, singer
 Marie Janson, first female Belgian senator
 Marthe de Kerchove de Denterghem, feminist, politician
 Helena Lemkovitch
 Lio, singer and actress
 Michel Ngonge, football player
 Blanche Rousseau (1875-1949), author
 Nathalie Uffner, actress and author
 Marguerite Van de Wiele, author
 Gabrielle Warnant, feminist, politician
 Mourade Zeguendi, actor

See also

Further reading 
 John Bartier, Lucien Cooremans, Un siècle d'enseignement féminin: le lycée royal Gatti de Gamond et sa fondatrice, Malvaux, Brussels,1964
 B. J. Baudart, Isabelle Gatti de Gamond et l'origine de l'enseignement secondaire des jeunes filles en Belgique, Castaigne, Brussels, 1949
 Pol Defosse, "Isabelle Gatti de Gamond", online at http://ligue-enseignement.be; accessed May 2017
 Eliane Gubin, Valérie Piette, Isabelle Gatti de Gamond, 1839-1905: La passion d'enseigner, Gief, ULB, Bruxelles, 2004
 Denise Karnaouch, "Féminisme et laïcité. 1848-1914", online at http://www.archivesdufeminisme.fr, December 2005; accessed May 2017
 Sharon Larson, "A New Model of Femininty: Marguerite Coppin, Decadent Fiction and Belgian Girls' Education", Dix Neuf, vol. 20, 2016
 Sylvie Lausberg, "Mémoire d'émail: Isabelle Gatti de Gamond (III). La franc-maçonne qui fit trembler la Belgique de Papa", Le Soir, 24 July 1998
 Anne Morelli, "Une école qui inspire... Le lycée Gatti de Gamond dans le roman", in Hervé Hasquin, Andrée Meyer, Libre pensée et pensée libre: combats et débats, Editions de l'Université libre de Bruxelles, Brussels, 1996, pp. 173-188
 Anne Morelli, "Isabelle Gatti de Gamond: socialiste et féministe", lecture delivered in Brussels town hall, 29 November 1989
 Valérie Piette, "Isabelle Gatti de Gamond ou l'égalité pour tous et toutes: de l'enseignement au socialisme et à la libre-pensée", lecture delivered in Brussels town hall, 3 October 2014
 Pierre Van den Dungen, "Parcours singuliers de femmes en lettres : Marie Closset, Blanche Rousseau et Marie Gaspar. Des cours d’éducation d’Isabelle Gatti de Gamond à quelques expériences éducatives buissonnières", Sextant, 13 (2000), pp. 189-209
 Kaat Wills, "Science, an Ally of Feminism? Isabelle Gatti de Gamond on Women and Science", Revue belge de philologie et d'histoire, 77 (1977)
 "Isabelle Gatti de Gamond et l'origine de l'enseignement secondaire des jeunes filles en Belgique", online at http://www.bibliomania.be [archive], consultation en mai 2017

References

External links 
  (French)

Schools in Brussels
Secondary schools in Brussels
1864 establishments in Belgium
Educational institutions established in 1864